Chen Hong (born February 11, 1994) is a Chinese ice dancer and ice dancing coach.  She began competing with Sun Zhuoming in the 2018–19 season, winning the silver medal at the 2019 Chinese Figure Skating Championships.

With her former skating partner, Zhao Yan, she is the 2017 Asian Winter Games bronze medalist and 2017 Chinese national champion. The two made their Grand Prix debut at the 2016 Cup of China. They placed tenth at the 2017 Four Continents Championships in Gangneung, South Korea.

Programs

With Sun

With Zhao

Competitive highlights 
GP: Grand Prix; CS: Challenger Series

With Sun

With Zhao

Coaching era 
As at the 2022-23 figure skating season, Chen Hong currently coaches the following ice dance teams:
  Zhang Meihong / Meng Bolin (2022 Chinese nationals bronze medalist)

References

External links 
 
 

1994 births
Chinese female ice dancers
Living people
Figure skaters from Harbin
Figure skaters at the 2017 Asian Winter Games
Medalists at the 2017 Asian Winter Games
Asian Games bronze medalists for China
Asian Games medalists in figure skating
Competitors at the 2015 Winter Universiade
Competitors at the 2017 Winter Universiade